Klondike Haynes (1 January 1878 – 3 February 1949) was an African American boxer billed as "The Black Hercules" who declared himself the black heavyweight champion (not to be confused with the World Colored Heavyweight Championship, which he officially fought for just once and unofficially another time). He took the nickname because he was supposed to be a great find (evoking the Klondike Gold Rush).

He made his professional boxing debut against future two-time colored heavyweight champ Frank Childs on 8 January 1898 at Chicago's 2nd Regiment Armory (a fight erroneously credited to lightweight Frank Young Haines). He was knocked out by Childs. Later that month, on 29 January, Childs won the world colored heavyweight title from Bob Armstrong and his first defense of the title was against Klondike on February 26. Childs won by a technical knockout when the referee stopped the fight in the fourth round of the scheduled six-round bout.

They fought again four times, as African American boxers were forced to fight one another often due to the color bar. Childs won every fight.

Klondike fought many of the top black heavyweights of his generation, including Johnson, the first black man to win the world heavyweight championship. Klondike first declared himself the black heavyweight champion after beating Johnson in the future world heavyweight champ's third pro fight at Chicago's Howard Theater on 8 May 1899. It was Klondike's eighth professional bout.

According to the Chicago Tribune, "...Johnson knocked Haines down in Round one with an uppercut, and only the bell saved Klondyke..."

Klondike and Johnson fought again twice, with one bout ending as a draw and the third with Johnson winning by a technical knockout.

Black Heavyweight Championship
On 4 September 1898, Frank Childs lost his world colored heavyweight title to George Byers. Regardless of losing the title, Childs fought Bob Armstrong again on 4 March 1899 in Cincinnati, Ohio in a fight announced as a title bought, despite Byers being the legitimate champion. He defeated Armstrong via a TKO in the sixth round of a 10-round bout.

On 11 August 1899, Childs challenged Klondike for his "Black Heavyweight Championship". In a six-round contest in Chicago, Childs prevailed by outpointing the "Black Hercules". On October 28 of that year, they met in a rematch in Chicago in which Childs retained the black heavyweight title by K.O.-ing Klondike in the third round of a six-round contest.

On 16 March 1900, Childs put his black heavyweight title on the line and Bryers put up his colored heavyweight crown in a six-round bout that ended in a draw. He fought Joe Butler on 15 December 1900 for the black heavyweight title, dispatching Butler via K.O. in the sixth. Finally, he took back the Colored World Heavyweight Championship legitimately from Bryers on 16 March 1901 in Hot Springs, Arkansas, K.O.-ing him in the 17th round of a 20-round fight. (He did not put up his black heavyweight title, which he never claimed again.)

Many years, later, when Sam Langford was denied a shot at the world heavyweight title by Jack Johnson, Langford claimed himself the colored heavyweight championship, much as Klondike had done a decade earlier when he declared himself the black heavyweight champ by beating the young Johnson. The problem with Langford's pretension was that the colored heavyweight title (which had been Johnson's from 1903 to 1908, when he vacated it upon winning the world heavyweight title) was held by Joe Jeanette.

On 13 July 1909, in Pittsburgh's Bijou Theater, Langford "claimed" the title by facing and defeating Klondike, the erstwhile black heavyweight champ, with a newspaper decision in a six-rounder. After defeating the Dixie Kid in a defense of his proclaimed title on September 29, Langford faced Klondike at the Armory in Boston in his second "title defense". He K.O.'ed Klondike in the second round of a 12-round fight. Langford eventually became undisputed champ when he beat Jeanette on 6 September 1910.

Klondike racked up an official record of 24 wins (14 by K.O.) against eleven losses (K.O.-ed six times) and three draws. He won five newspaper decisions, lost three and drew two.

Professional boxing record
All information in this section is derived from BoxRec, unless otherwise stated.

Official record

All Newspaper decisions are regarded as “no decision” bouts as they have “resulted in neither boxer winning or losing, and would therefore not count as part of their official fight record."

Unofficial record

Record with the inclusion of Newspaper decisions to the win/loss/draw column.

References

|-

External links
 

1878 births
1949 deaths
African-American boxers
Heavyweight boxers
American male boxers
Place of birth missing
20th-century African-American people